Sporting Clube Farim is a Guinea-Bissauan football club based in Farim. They play in the 2 division in Guinean football, the Campeonato Nacional da Guine-Bissau.

Current squad

Farim